Ryne Tanner Nelson (born February 1, 1998) is an American professional baseball pitcher for the Arizona Diamondbacks of Major League Baseball (MLB).

Amateur career
Nelson attended and graduated from Basic High School in Henderson, Nevada. As a junior, he batted .412 with four home runs and 22 RBIs along with pitching to a 6-1 record with a 2.03 ERA. In 2016, his senior year, he compiled a 1.91 ERA while batting .415, leading Basic to a state championship and earning a spot on the Nevada All-State team. Unselected out of high school in the 2016 Major League Baseball draft, he enrolled at the University of Oregon to play college baseball for the Oregon Ducks.

In 2017, as a freshman at Oregon, Nelson suffered an injury and pitched only  innings in which he had a 4.72 ERA. As a sophomore in 2018, he returned healthy and appeared in 16 games out of the bullpen, going 3-1 with a 3.86 ERA. He spent that summer playing in the Cape Cod Baseball League for the Yarmouth–Dennis Red Sox with whom he was named an All-Star. For the 2019 season, he was moved into the starting rotation, but returned to the bullpen after suffering a heel injury. He finished the year with a 3-4 record and a 4.29 ERA in 23 appearances (four starts), earning him a spot on the All-Pac-12 Team.

Professional career
Nelson was considered one of the top prospects for the 2019 Major League Baseball draft. He was selected by the Arizona Diamondbacks in the second round, with the 56th overall pick, and signed for $1.1 million. He was assigned to the Hillsboro Hops of the Class A-Short Season Northwest League, going 0-1 with a 2.89 ERA over  innings, striking out 26. He did not play a minor league game in 2020 due to the cancellation of the minor league season caused by the COVID-19 pandemic. 

To begin the 2021 season, Nelson returned to Hillsboro, now members of the High-A West. After eight starts in which he pitched to a 4-1 record with a 2.52 ERA and 59 strikeouts over  innings, he was promoted to the Amarillo Sod Poodles of the Double-A Central. Over 14 starts with Amarillo, Nelson went 3-3 with a 3.51 ERA and 104 strikeouts over 77 innings. The Diamondbacks named Nelson their Minor League Pitcher of the Year. He was assigned to the Reno Aces of the Triple-A Pacific Coast League to begin the 2022 season.

On September 5, 2022, the Diamondbacks selected Nelson's contract and promoted him to the major leagues. He made his MLB debut that night as the club's starting pitcher versus the San Diego Padres, throwing seven scoreless innings while striking out seven batters and walking zero in a 5-0 Diamondbacks win.

References

External links

Oregon Ducks bio

1998 births
Living people
Sportspeople from the Las Vegas Valley
Baseball players from Nevada
Major League Baseball pitchers
Arizona Diamondbacks players
Oregon Ducks baseball players
Yarmouth–Dennis Red Sox players
Hillsboro Hops players
Amarillo Sod Poodles players
Reno Aces players